The Farmers' Weekly Review is a newspaper founded in 1921 and published out of Joliet, Illinois in Will County. 

It is a countywide newspaper providing local news and columns, farming news in the county, information about local activities and advertisements.

References

External links 
 Farmers Weekly Review: Homepage
 Illinois Digital Newspaper Collections: Farmers' Weekly Review (1929-2011)

Joliet, Illinois